Francis Mahon Jervis (26 December 1870 – 20 December 1952) was a New Zealand rugby union player. A wing three-quarter, Jervis represented . He was a member of the New Zealand national side on their 1893 tour of Australia, playing in 10 of the 11 matches and scoring 38 points in all, making him the highest scorer on tour.

His great grandsons are former New Zealand cricketers, Martin and Jeff Crowe through his daughter Ngaire.

References

1870 births
1952 deaths
Rugby union players from Auckland
People educated at Auckland Grammar School
New Zealand rugby union players
New Zealand international rugby union players
Auckland rugby union players
Rugby union wings